Jiří Klíma (born 5 January 1997) is a Czech football player. He plays for FC Baník Ostrava.

Club career
He made his Czech First League debut for Vysočina Jihlava on 14 May 2016 in a game against Sparta Prague.

References

External links

Jiří Klíma official international statistics 

1997 births
Living people
Czech footballers
Czech Republic youth international footballers
FC Vysočina Jihlava players
1. SC Znojmo players
FK Mladá Boleslav players
FC Baník Ostrava players
Czech First League players
Association football forwards